The Channel Four Daily (or Channel 4 Daily) is a breakfast television news magazine, which was produced by Independent Television News, in collaboration with other independent production companies for Channel 4. The programme was Channel 4's first breakfast programme, broadcasting between 6am (6.30am from April 1990) and 9.25am each weekday morning. The first edition of the programme was broadcast on 3 April 1989, with the last edition being broadcast on 25 September 1992.

The Channel Four Daily failed to gain enough viewers and was replaced with The Big Breakfast from Monday, 28 September 1992.

Format 
Conceived as a television newspaper, the content was a mix of short news bulletins and non-news segments. The flagship bulletin World News was co-presented from three continents. Also, a number of bite-sized feature segments (some live, others pre-recorded) lasting between 5 and 10 minutes were slotted around the news output and were shown several times each day. These included a business programme (Business Daily, which had been on air as a lunchtime programme since September 1987), sporting discussion (Kickback), consumer reports (Streetwise), arts and entertainment (Box Office), Countdown Masters – an abbreviated version of Countdown – and a cartoon slot called Comic Book.

Changes were made in April 1990. These included the cancellation of Streetwise and an International Sports Report replaced Kickback. The programme's length was reduced with the start time being 6.30am rather than 6am – The Art of Landscape and an edition of Business Daily filled the vacated 30 minute slot.

Presenters
London presenters
Carol Barnes (1989–1991)
Dermot Murnaghan (1991–1992)
Caroline Righton (1991–1992)

Washington presenter
Michael Nicholson

Tokyo presenters
James Mates
Sonia Ruseler

Other presenters
 David Bobin – International Sports Report
 Damian Green – Business Daily
 Debbie Greenwood and Paddy Haycocks – Streetwise
 Dermot Murnaghan – Business Daily (1989–1991)
 Kim Newman – Box Office, providing movie reviews
 Nicholas Owen – relief presenter
 Carol Vorderman and Richard Whiteley – Countdown Masters

References

Bibliography
 Ian Jones, Morning Glory: A history of British breakfast television, Kelly, 2004 

1989 British television series debuts
1992 British television series endings
Channel 4 original programming
ITN
Breakfast television in the United Kingdom